Bena (Bəna,  Binna, Buna, Ebina, Ebuna, Gbinna, "Lala", Purra, Yangeru, Yongor, Yungur) is an Adamawa language of Nigeria.

Bena-Yungur has a 3-tone system.
Location-the Yungur people are majorly located in Song, local government of Adamawa state, constituting 75% of the total population of the Local area

References

Languages of Nigeria
Bambukic languages